"" is a song by Albanian singer and songwriter Alban Ramosaj. The song was written and composed by Ramosaj himself and produced by Marko Polo. It was independently released as a single for digital download and streaming on 3 December 2021. The song is an Albanian-language ethnic ballad combining traditional Albanian instruments and sounds, with its lyrics focusing on the theme of unconditional love. Music critics and fans applauded the song, with praise concentrated on its ethnic nature and instrumentation, as well as Ramosaj's vocal delivery. An accompanying lyric video was premiered to the singer's official YouTube channel simultaneously with the single's release on 3 December.

In late December 2021, Ramosaj competed with "" in the 60th edition of  intentionally to represent Albania in the Eurovision Song Contest 2022 in Turin, Italy. During the final, the singer finished in the second place despite being a favourite to win the contest. His performance commenced in black and white and progressed with colours, while the background LED screens displayed thunder and dark imagery.

Background and release 

Thereafter, "" was independently released as a single in various territories for digital download and streaming on 3 December 2021. An accompanying lyric video was uploaded to Ramosaj's YouTube channel simultaneously with the single's release.

Composition and reception 

"", which translated means "Break it", was composed and written by Ramosaj himself, with additional mastering and mixing as well as the production done by Albanian composer Marko Polo. The Albanian-language song is musically an ethnic ballad with a blend of traditional Albanian instruments and sounds. Lyrically, the song touches on the theme of unconditional love and delves into a past relationship of the singer, in which he forgave and continued to offer love and trust to his love interest. Upon its release, "" was met with generally positive reviews from music critics. In a review for ESCUnited conducted by several staff members, "" has been described as a "pleasant" and "epic" ethnic ballad with an "emotional vibe" and a traditional Albanian nature, which was praised by multiple writers. Incorporating what writer William saw as building in "unexpected ways", the song begins into a "mystery surrounding" developing from the verse into two following "epic" choruses before ending "out of nowhere". Writer Tom Padraig of Wiwibloggs similarly expressed praise towards the song's structure as well as Ramosaj's vocal delivery.

Festivali i Këngës 

The contest consisted of two semi-finals on 27 and 28 December, respectively, and the grand final on 29 December 2021. Ramosaj was officially announced as a selected contestant to participate in the contest in November 2021. During his shows, Ramosaj's performance commenced in black and white with thunder being featured on the LED walls throughout the performance. While music critics were favorable towards both Ramosaj's vocal delivery and the song's ethnic nature, he was regarded by the media as a strong contender and became among the Eurovision fans favourite to win the contest. He later expressed his gratitude and thanked his fans for their support through a social media post, while saying that he counts 2021 as his year.

Personnel 

Credits adapted from YouTube.

Alban Ramosajcomposing, choir, guitarist, songwriting, vocals
Marko Polochoir, mastering, mixing, producing
Alex Seitajchoir
Kris Breshajchoir
Xhesika Polochoir
Telando Fetoflute

Track listing 

Digital download
""3:04

Release history

References 

2020s ballads
2021 singles
2021 songs
Albanian-language songs
Festivali i Këngës songs